The Three Rivers Conference, also known as the TRAC-8 (Three Rivers Athletics Conference), is a high school conference in northwest Illinois. The conference participates in athletics and activities in the Illinois High School Association. The conference comprises small public, and two private, high schools with enrollments between 200-600 students in portions of Bureau, Henry, Lee, Rock Island, and Whiteside counties.

Current Membership

Sources:IHSA Conferences, IHSA Coop Teams, and IHSA Member Schools Directory

History
The Three Rivers Conference formed in 1975, and was largely the result of the dissolution of two conferences that had also included high schools in Iowa. Fulton, Morrison, Riverdale, Savanna and Sterling Newman had been part of the Illowa Conference along with Iowa schools North Scott of Eldridge, Central Clinton of De Witt, and St. Mary's High School of Clinton. Erie and Prophetstown were members of a league with the Iowa-based Pleasant Valley, Camanche and Northeast of Goose Lake. The seven Illinois schools joined with Amboy to form the new TRAC-8 conference.

Throughout the conference's history, alignment changes included the departure of Savanna, which went on to join the Northwest Upstate Illini Conference, and the additions of Bureau Valley in the mid-1990s and Kewanee in 2010. Upon the addition of Kewanee, the league became known as the TRAC-9. In addition, Erie and Prophetstown formed a cooperative to share certain sports programs, including football and wrestling.

On January 12, 2012 the conference approved expansion for six schools to join the league beginning in the 2013-14 school year. Included in the expansion are Orion, Rockridge, Sherrard, Princeton, St. Bede Academy of Peru and Spring Valley Hall. The six additions make the Three Rivers a 15-team league, one of the largest in Illinois. The conference will be split into two divisions, with Interstate 80 being the dividing line.

Following the 2015-16 school year, Amboy will leave the conference and join the Northwest Upstate Illini Conference for the 2016-17 school year. Following the 2021 season, Fulton will be leaving to join the Northwest Upstate Illini Conference, however, Mendota and Monmouth-Roseville, who has been playing football within the conference since 2016, will be joining the conference fully in 2021.

Current members Bureau Valley, Erie-Prophetstown, Kewanee, Mendota, Monmouth-Roseville, Morrison, Orion, Peru St. Bede, Princeton, Riverdale, Rockridge, Sherrard, Spring Valley Hall, and Sterling Newman. The divisions in the conference are geographically set. 
The East includes: Bureau Valley, Kewanee, Mendota, St. Bede, Princeton, Hall and Newman Central Catholic.
The West includes: Erie-Prophetstown, Monmouth-Roseville, Morrison, Orion, Riverdale, Rockridge and Sherrard.

Football
The Three Rivers Conference dropped football from 1999 until the 2013-14 school year. During this hiatus, the league offered championships in other sports, and member schools, either independently or as part of a co-operative, participated in the football-exclusive Big Rivers Conference.

In early 2012, it was announced that Orion, Rockridge, Sherrard, all former members of the Olympic Conference, and Princeton accepted an invitation for full membership in the Three Rivers Conference at the start of the 2013-14 school year.  These four schools, along with Hall, Kewanee, and St. Bede Academy make up the seven teams in the newly created South Division.  The North Division includes Amboy-La Moille, Bureau Valley, Erie-Prophetstown, Fulton, Morrison, Newman Central Catholic, and Riverdale.  The decision to create a geographical North-South alignment was based upon a desire to maintain existing rivalries and minimize travel times.

The football schedule includes six intra-divisional games and three rotating inter-divisional cross-over match-ups.  Each division will award a conference champion.
Because the Big Rivers Conference and the Three Rivers Conference, co-operatives excepted, consist of the same member schools with this most recent expansion, the decision was made to drop the Big Rivers name in favor of the longer-standing Three Rivers Conference.

Conference Champions

2013

NORTH- Sterling Newman

SOUTH- Taylor Ridge (Rockridge)

See the Big Rivers Conference article for information about its history, achievements, and participating schools.

Membership History

Membership timeline 
Prior to the development of the TRAC-8, the IHSA was pushing teams to end multi-state conferences. Therefore, Fulton, Morrison, Riverdale, Savanna and Newman came from the dissolved Illowa Conference, Amboy left the Wisconsin-Illinois SHARK Conference and Erie and Prophetstown, then competing as individual high schools, left the Iowa-Illinois Pleasant Valley Conference.

From 1999 to 2012, the TRAC-8 dropped football from the conference. In order to maintain competition, the teams from the Three Rivers' football programs including: Amboy, Erie, Fulton, Morrison, Sterling Newman, Prophetstown, Riverdale, and Savanna joined the ranks of Tri-County Conference schools Peru St. Bede, Bureau Valley, Ottawa Marquette, Eureka, and Bradford (now Stark County High School) to make up the newly formed Big Rivers Conference's Illinois Division.

Competitive Success
The Three Rivers Conference has won 11 state championships in IHSA sponsored athletics and activities, 16 if wins by member schools participating in the Big Rivers Conference are counted.

State Champions
Boys Golf
Riverdale (2017 1A)

Boys Track
Newman Central Catholic (2012-2013 1A)

Boys Cross Country
Newman Central Catholic (2009-2010 1A)

Girls Cross Country

Boys Football
Amboy (1984-85 2A)
Bureau Valley (2005-2006 3A)*
Fulton (1976-1977 2A)
Fulton (1991-1992 2A)
Hall (1995-1996 3A)**
Hall (2001-2002 3A)**
Morrison (2009-2010 2A)*
Morrison (2011-2012 2A)*
Newman Central Catholic (1990-1991 1A)
Newman Central Catholic (1994-1995 1A)
Newman Central Catholic (2004-2005 2A)*
Newman Central Catholic (2010-2011 2A)*

* Participating in Big Rivers Conference
**Participating in NCIC

Boys Wrestling
Newman Central Catholic (2010-2011 1A)
Newman Central Catholic (1984-1985 A)
Savanna (1976-1977 A)
Savanna (1978-1979 A)
Savanna (1979-1980 A)
Savanna (1981-1982 A)

Softball
Morrison (2010-2011 2A)
Rockridge (2017-2018 2A)

References

External links 
 Amboy High School
 Bureau Valley High School
 Erie High School
 Fulton High School 
 Morrison High School 
 Newman Central Catholic High School 
 Prophetstown High School
 Riverdale High School 

High school sports conferences and leagues in the United States
Illinois high school sports conferences
High school sports in Illinois